Una bella governante di colore is a 1976 Italian commedia sexy all'italiana directed by Luigi Russo and starring Renzo Montagnani with Pasolini muse Ines Pellegrini.

In France, the film was released in an adult version with addition of two French-produced hardcore sequences and under the title Poupées sur canapé in 1978.

Plot 
Nicola Salluzzi (Montagnani) is the owner of an insecticide company and his teenage son Simone (Jean-Claude Verné) has the habit of sleeping with his female employees. After Simone has impregnated successive housemaids and put the family name in jeopardy, Nicola and his wife Aspasia (Marisa Merlini) decide to hire a black housemaid, presuming that she will be just too ugly. However, the new housemaid Myriam (Pellegrini) soon attracts Simone with her exotic beauty. On the other hand, Nicola is also troubled in his relationship with his mistress Dr. Santina (Orchidea De Santis).

Cast 
 Renzo Montagnani as Nicola Salluzzi
 Jean-Claude Verné as Simone Salluzzi
 Ines Pellegrini as Myriam
 Orchidea De Santis as Dr. Santina
 Marisa Merlini as Aspasia Salluzzi
 Carlo Delle Piane as Pasquale, Aspasia's brother 
 Gianfranco D'Angelo as Prof. Klipper
 Lu-Maria Lise as Nicola's secretary

References

External links

Commedia sexy all'italiana
1970s sex comedy films
1970s Italian-language films
1976 films
1970s Italian films